Manuel Flores may refer to:

 Manuel N. Flores (1801–1868), volunteer in the Texas army
 Manuel Flores Mora (1923–1984), Uruguayan journalist and politician
 Manuel Flores (basketball) (born 1951), Spanish Olympic basketball player
 Manuel Flores (American politician) (born 1972), member of the Chicago City Council
 Manuel Pérez Flores (born 1980), Mexican footballer who played as a midfielder